Halitherium is an extinct dugongid sea cow that arose in the late Eocene, then became extinct during the early Oligocene. Its fossils are common in European shales. Inside its flippers were finger bones that did not stick out. Halitherium also had the remnants of back legs, which did not show externally. However, it did have a basic femur, joined to a reduced pelvis. Halitherium also had elongated ribs, presumably  to increase lung capacity to provide fine control of buoyancy. A 2014 review presented the opinion that the genus is dubious.

Classification 
Halitherium is the type genus of the subfamily Halitheriinae, which includes the well-known genera Eosiren and Eotheroides and lived from the Eocene to the Oligocene.

Taxonomy 
 
The genus Halitherium has had a confusing nomenclatural history. It was originally coined by Johann Jakob Kaup on the basis of a premolar from the early Oligocene (Rupelian) of southern Germany, but Kaup himself mistakenly stated that the premolar, in his opinion, gehort zu Hippopotamus dubius Cuv., unaware that H. dubius is actually a junior synonym of the primitive sirenian Protosiren minima, while simultaneously coining the genus and species name Pugmeodon schinzii for the same specimen. For his part, the renowned German paleontologist Christian Erich Hermann von Meyer included the type specimen of Halitherium schinzii in his composite species Halianassa studeri, whose hypodigm also included the type specimens of Metaxytherium medium and Protosiren minima as well as a Miocene-age maxilla and a skeleton from the molasse basin in Switzerland.

Later, Kaup synonymized Pugmeodon with Halitherium creating the new combination Halitherium schinzii, and the name Halitherium became universally accepted for the early Oligocene halitheriine material from Europe. Because Halitherium was originally based on a misidentified type species and due to the widespread use of Halitherium, the sirenian specialist Daryl Domning petitioned the ICZN to designate Pugmeodon schinzii as the type species of Halitherium, and the proposal was approved by the Commission in 1989, effectively making Pugmeodon a junior objective synonym of Halitherium in line with the current concept of Halitherium introduced by Kaup himself.

Voss (2013, 2014) dismisses Halitherium as a nomen dubium by virtue of being based on non-diagnostic remains. Voss based the opinion on the type species, H. schinzii, being nomen dubium, with its holotype fossil, an isolated molar, having no diagnostic value. and a 2017 study found specimens traditionally assigned to Halitherium schinzii to be two separate species, one of which takes the name Halitherium bronni Krauss, 1858. Because Halitherium is dubious, H. bronni has been re-assigned to Kaupitherium. The species Halitherium alleni Simpson, 1932, described by Simpson (1932) from skull caps in Oligocene deposits in Puerto Rico, is basal to the two Kaupitherium species.

Formerly assigned species
Halitherium antillense Matthew, 1916; nomen dubium
Halitherium christolii Fitzinger, 1842 = Lentiarenium
Halitherium bellunense de Zigno, 1875 = Italosiren
Halitherium taulannense Sange, 2001; distinct, unnamed genus 
Halitherium olseni Rinehart, 1976 = Crenatosiren

Related species 
Metaxytherium
Rytiodus

See also 
 Evolution of sirenians

References

Bibliography 
Marine Mammals: Evolutionary Biology by Annalisa Berta, James L. Sumich, and Kit M. Kovacs 
Encyclopedia of Marine Mammals by William F. Perrin, Bernd Wursig, and J. G.M. Thewissen
Classification of Mammals by Malcolm C. McKenna and Susan K. Bell
The Rise of Placental Mammals: Origins and Relationships of the Major Extant Clades by Kenneth D. Rose and J. David Archibald

Eocene sirenians
Oligocene sirenians
Priabonian life
Rupelian life
Eocene mammals of Europe
Oligocene mammals of Europe
Fossil taxa described in 1838
Nomina dubia
Prehistoric placental genera